Chucena is a town and municipality located in the province of Huelva, Spain. In the 2005 census, it had a population of 2044 inhabitants and covered a 26 km2 area (78.6 people per km2). It is at an altitude of 147 m above sea level, and 62 km from the capital.

References

External links
Chucena - Sistema de Información Multiterritorial de Andalucía

Municipalities in the Province of Huelva